Ministry of Posts and Telecommunications may refer to:
 Ministry of Posts, Telecommunications and Information Technology, Bangladesh
  (1949–1998)
 Ministry of Posts and Telecommunications (Japan) (1946–2001)
 Ministry of Posts and Telecommunications (Laos)
 Ministry of Post and Telecommunications (Myanmar)
 Ministry of Post and Telecommunications (North Korea)
 Ministry of Posts and Telecommunications (United Kingdom)
 See List of postal entities for other countries

See also

 Department of Posts and Telegraphs (Ireland)